The 2010 1000 km of Spa was the second round of the 2010 Le Mans Series season. It took place at the Circuit de Spa-Francorchamps on 9 May 2010.

Qualifying
Qualifying saw Peugeot take pole position in their first and only race of the season, beating Audi Sport North America by 0.6 seconds. Strakka Racing once again took pole in the LMP2 class.  They qualified 2.5 seconds quicker than the next nearest LMP2 car, the RML Lola-HPD. Hope Polevision Racing took the Formula Le Mans pole beating Boutsen Energy Racing by 0.5 seconds. Marc VDS took the GT1 pole in their first Le Mans Series event, racing a Ford GT they also use in the 2010 FIA GT1 World Championship season. They qualified 1.5 seconds ahead of the next nearest GT1 car, a Ford GT also used by fellow GT1 World Championship contenders and LMS débutants Matech Competition. AF Corse once again took the GT2 pole but only by 0.08 seconds over Team Felbermayr-Proton.

Qualifying result
Pole position winners in each class are marked in bold.

Race

Race result

Class winners in bold.  Cars failing to complete 70% of winner's distance marked as Not Classified (NC).

See also
1000 km Spa

References

Spa
6 Hours of Spa-Francorchamps
1000km
Auto races in Belgium